Paul John Kern (born June 16, 1945) is a retired United States Army general and businessman. He served as Commanding General of the United States Army Materiel Command from October 2001 to November 2004. He became President and Chief Operating Officer of AM General LLC on August 1, 2008.

Military service
Kern is a native of West Orange, New Jersey, and attended West Orange High School in his hometown. He was commissioned in 1967 as an Armor officer following graduation from the United States Military Academy. In 1973 he earned master's degrees in both mechanical and civil engineering from the University of Michigan.

Kern served two tours in Vietnam with the 11th Armored Cavalry Regiment as a platoon leader and troop commander, and was a battalion operations officer with the 3rd Armored Division in Germany. He also commanded the 5th Battalion, 32nd Armor, 24th Infantry Division at Fort Stewart, Georgia; commanded the 2nd Brigade, 24th Infantry Division at Fort Stewart and during Desert Shield/Desert Storm; and was the Assistant Division Commander of the 24th Infantry Division after redeployment to Fort Stewart.

Kern also served as the Commander, 4th Infantry Division (Mechanized). He was also the senior military assistant to the Secretary of Defense and Deputy Secretary of Defense; military staff assistant, Defense Research and Engineering for Test and Evaluation, Office of the Secretary of Defense; and Director of Requirements (Support Systems), Office of the Deputy Chief of Staff for Operations and Plans. Kern also served as Team Chief, Light Combat Vehicle Team, Office of the Deputy Chief of Staff for Research, Development and Acquisition, and as the Program Branch Chief, Bradley Fighting Vehicle Systems, Warren, Michigan. He taught weapon systems and automotive engineering at the United States Military Academy and was the department's research officer.

In June 2004 Kern was chosen to head the internal military investigation of the Abu Ghraib torture scandal, also referred to as the Fay Report.

Awards and decorations
Kern's awards and decorations include the Defense Distinguished Service Medal, Army Distinguished Service Medal, Silver Star, Defense Superior Service Medal, Legion of Merit (with oak leaf cluster), Bronze Star Medal (with Valor device and oak leaf cluster), Bronze Star Medal (with two oak leaf clusters), Purple Heart (with two oak leaf clusters), Meritorious Service Medal (with four oak leaf clusters), Army Commendation Medal, Parachutist Badge, and Ranger Tab.

  Defense Distinguished Service Medal
  Army Distinguished Service Medal
  Silver Star
  Defense Superior Service Medal
  Legion of Merit with oak leaf cluster
  Bronze Star Medal with Valor Device and oak leaf cluster, Bronze Star with two oak leaf clusters
  Purple Heart with two oak leaf clusters
  Meritorious Service Medal with four oak leaf clusters
  Army Commendation Medal
  Parachutist Badge
  Ranger Tab

Post-military life
After retiring from the army in January 2005, Kern joined the Board of Directors of Agent Science Technologies, EDO Corporation and iRobot Corporation, and is a member of the External Advisory Board of the University of Michigan Department of Mechanical Engineering, and a Senior Counselor of The Cohen Group.

In 2007, Kern was elected a member of the National Academy of Engineering for bringing modern digitization technology to bear on military effectiveness, training, and procurement.

Kern now serves as the Chair of Advanced Technology in the Department of Civil and Mechanical Engineering at the United States Military Academy.

References

1945 births
Living people
United States Army generals
United States Military Academy alumni
Recipients of the Distinguished Service Medal (US Army)
Recipients of the Silver Star
Recipients of the Legion of Merit
United States Army personnel of the Vietnam War
United States Army personnel of the Gulf War
University of Michigan College of Engineering alumni
People from West Orange, New Jersey
West Orange High School (New Jersey) alumni
Recipients of the Defense Superior Service Medal
Members of the United States National Academy of Engineering
American chief operating officers
Recipients of the Defense Distinguished Service Medal
Military personnel from New Jersey